Louie Mildred Bickerton Cozens (née Bickerton) (11 August 1902  – 6 June 1998) was a female tennis player from Australia.  She was born in Clifton Hill, Victoria, Australia and won the women's doubles titles at the 1927, 1929, and 1931 Australian Championships. She won the mixed doubles title at those championships in 1935 and was the runner-up in the 1929 singles and 1935 women's doubles at that tournament.

Perhaps Bickerton's biggest singles victory outside of Australia was her first round defeat of 44-year-old and eight time U.S. champion Molla Bjurstedt Mallory in the first round of Wimbledon in 1928. The score was 6–3, 4–6, 6–4. 

Bickerton was friends with Daphne Akhurst Cozens. In 1935 she married Daphne's widower, Royston Stuckey Cozens, to whom she remained married for 63 years until her death at the age of 95.

Grand Slam finals

Singles (1 runner-up)

Doubles (3 titles, 1 runner-up)

Grand Slam singles tournament timeline

Notes

See also 
 Performance timelines for all female tennis players who reached at least one Grand Slam final

Australian Championships (tennis) champions
Australian female tennis players
1902 births
1998 deaths
Sportswomen from Victoria (Australia)
Grand Slam (tennis) champions in women's doubles
Grand Slam (tennis) champions in mixed doubles
Tennis players from Melbourne
People from Clifton Hill, Victoria